The Stenographers' Guild, founded in 1937, is a non-profit organization providing vocational education and training in the area of Secretarial skills, Information Technology and Shorthand. It is located in T. Nagar, Chennai in the Indian state of Tamil Nadu.

History
Pitman Shorthand was introduced in 1837 with the release of the inventor's book, Stenographic Sound Hand. It reached Madras in 1886 when a commercial school run by the Pachaiyappa Charities began teaching the language. The Stenographers' Guild was formed fifty years later under the initiative of N. Subramania Iyer, a reporter at the Corporation of Madras, and S. Sivaramakrishna Iyer and P. Ramanuja Iyer, shorthand writers of the High Court of Madras, who convened a meeting in Panagal Park attended by about 40 shorthand writers from the Courts, Police, Government and newspapers. The Guild was inaugurated by C. Rajagopalachari, at the time Chief Minister of Madras, on September 26, 1937. It was to be two more years before the Guild was to be registered as a society. Its aim was to train shorthand writers.

In 2005, The Guild, in association with The Steno Trust, United States, launched a new system of shorthand called Newrite. It was invented by the American Scientist, Walter P. Kistler.

Its key proponent Mr. S.V. Ramaswamy developed the institution to a great extent by bringing into being a lot of Government sponsored courses that offers free education on Computers, Shorthand, Accountancy, Personality Development, Spoken English, Bank Coaching etc., to all poor and needy at free of cost. Some of them are TADCO, Tamil Nadu Women Development Corporation, Tamil Nadu Slum Clearance Board, Employment Exchange, Tamil Nadu Police Academy etc., With the efforts of Mr. S. V. Ramaswamy, the Guild saw immense growth with the influx of students thronging the place that aims at producing quality. Some of the key contributors for the development of the institution are Mr. N. Murali, Co-Chairman, Kasturi & Sons, Mr.N Ram, Chairman, Kasturi & Sons etc., are worth mentioning.

Mr. S. V. Ramaswamy was forced to leave the 29 years of service to the society when he died of a massive cardiac arrest at the age of 57 on 13 August 2010.

Present Committee
Mr. S.R. Sivasubramaniam is now the Hon. President of The Stenographers' Guild.  He is also the son of Shri. S. V. Ramaswamy.  He completed his graduation in Commerce and keeps his being in the field of Remote Infrastructure services of Information Technology.  He and his Executive Committee team are in the verge of taking the name of the institution to greater heights.

.

References

External links
 The Stenographer's Guild website
 H.E. The Governor Dr. K. Rosaiah praises the Guild on its Platinum Jubilee occasion
 Secretary, Revenue Administration distributes certificates to students and praises the efforts of The Steno Guild
 S R Sivasubramaniam & Dr S Sekar on the importance of Stenography in an exclusive interview to NT and the extent of awareness required to pursue this art

Organizations established in 1937
Non-profit organisations based in India
Shorthand systems
Indian vocational education and training providers
1937 establishments in India